Port Whines is a 1929 animated short film by the Columbia Pictures Corporation. It is the 136th Krazy Kat cartoon.

Plot 
The story starts with a galleon sailing across the ocean. On it, Krazy is a seaman whose routines include mopping the main deck. After cleaning, he goes for a stroll around the vessel. As he continues moving, Krazy accidentally bumps into the captain who is quite irritable.

The captain starts chasing Krazy, only to slip on a soap bar and get airborne. Very quickly, the other seamen come in and cushion his fall. Remembering how unpleasantly ill-tempered their leader is, however, the seamen hurl the captain off the ship's side where he plunges into the water. Following that, they and Krazy begin to celebrate the deed with some music and dancing.

In a kitchen levelled with the main deck, an Oriental chef was trying to fry fish on skillets but notices that fish is in short supply. The chef comes outside and orders Krazy to do some fishing. Krazy takes a pole and casts a line. Moments later, something is caught, and Krazy starts to reel in. It turns out what is pulled in is the captain. The chef, who isn't very happy with the result, tries to punch Krazy but misses as the cat ducks. Instead the captain is the one struck; the captain then hits back in a similar fashion. For the rest of the film, the captain and the chef punch each other repeatedly, and Krazy is enjoying the sight.

Availability 
Columbia Cartoon Collection: Volume 1.

See also 
 Krazy Kat filmography

References

External links 
Port Whines at the Big Cartoon Database
 

1929 films
1929 animated films
American black-and-white films
Krazy Kat shorts
Seafaring films
Columbia Pictures short films
Films set on ships
1920s American animated films
American animated short films
Columbia Pictures animated short films
Screen Gems short films